Craveman is the twelfth studio album by American rock musician Ted Nugent, released on September 24, 2002.

The album continues the trend, started in the mid-1990s, of Nugent returning to the rawer, harder-rocking sound that made him famous in the 1970s. This stands in sharp contrast to the synth-pop of his 1980s work, and the romantic AOR power-ballads of his early 1990s band Damn Yankees. This album also contains some material from an unreleased Damn Yankees album, Bravo.

Reception
Critic Eduardo Rivadavia of AllMusic gave Craveman a positive 4 stars out of a possible 5, declaring it Nugent's "fiercest effort in decades, and certainly his heaviest ever."

Track listing
All songs are written by Ted Nugent, except where noted,
"Klstrphnky" – 3:55
"Crave" (Blades, Nugent) – 6:19
"Rawdogs & Warhogs"  – 3:37
"Damned If Ya Do" (Blades, Nugent, Shaw) – 4:21
"At Home There" (Brendan Lynch, Nugent, Greg Wells) – 3:49
"Cum N Gitya Sum-o-This" – 2:37
"Change My Sex" – 3:03
"I Won’t Go Away" (Damon Johnson, Nugent) – 5:32
"Pussywhipped" – 3:00
"Goin' Down Hard" (Mike Lutz, Nugent, Alto Reed) – 4:13
"Wang Dang Doodle" (Willie Dixon) – 2:58
"My Baby Likes My Butter on Her Gritz" (Marco Mendoza, Nugent) - 3:52
"Sexpot" – 3:11
"Earthtones" [instrumental] (Mendoza, Nugent) – 5:39

Credits

Band members
 Ted Nugent – guitars, lead vocals, producer
 Marco Mendoza – bass guitar, percussion, backing vocals, lead vocals on "At Home There"
 Tommy Clufetos – drums, percussion, backing vocals

Production
 Chris Peters – producer
 Drew Peters – producer, engineer
 Ben Began – engineer, mixing
 Joe Lambert – mastering

References

Ted Nugent albums
2002 albums
Spitfire Records albums